Socialist Workers’ Party of Iran is a small Iranian communist party exiled in England. The party is a merger of two Trotskyist groups based abroad, "Trotskyists", the first Trotskyist group in the history of Persian communism that was founded by Iranian students in London in 1960s, and another group created in the United States with the help of Socialist Workers Party by Babak Zahraei. The two groups were unaware of each other, but were brought together via Fourth International.

The party members were few in number and activity and not very influential among leftists in Iran.

References

Banned communist parties
Communist parties in Iran
Political parties of the Iranian Revolution
Far-left politics
Banned political parties in Iran
Trotskyist organizations in Asia
Communist parties in England